Doug Young (August 21, 1944 – October 7, 2005) was an American national and world powerlifting champion multiple times throughout his career while competing in the 242 lb. and 275 lb. weight classes.

Doug won his third straight world championship title at the 1977 IPF world championships. He posted a 1,956 pound total (699 lb. squat, 545 lb. bench press, and 710 lb. deadlift) while sustaining three broken ribs. Doug is credited with benching 612 pounds in 1978 while wearing just a T-shirt.

American football offensive guard Bob Young was his older brother.

Death
On October 7, 2005, in Abilene, Texas, Doug suffered a massive heart attack and died instantly.

Personal records
Squat - 
Bench press - 
Deadlift - 
Total -

References

External links
"Doug Young - Bench Press Program" (Jan 06 2010) Strength Oldschool with photograph

American strength athletes
1944 births
2005 deaths
American powerlifters
Place of birth missing
Sportspeople from Texas